John Coleman (October 9, 1847 – October 30, 1904) was a United States Marine who received the United States military's highest decoration for bravery—the Medal of Honor—for his actions during the Korean Expedition.

Coleman joined the Union Army in July 1863, claiming to be 18 years old. He served with the 16th New York Cavalry Regiment and 3rd New York Provisional Cavalry Regiment until mustering out in September 1865. He enlisted in the Marine Corps from Brooklyn in January 1870, and retired in August 1893.

Coleman later died in California, and was buried at Mount Hope Cemetery in San Diego. His gravestone only mentions his Civil War service.

Medal of Honor citation
Rank and organization. Private, U.S. Marine Corps. Born: October 9, 1847, Ireland. Accredited to: California. G.O. No. 169, February 8, 1872.

Citation.

On board the U.S.S. Colorado in action at Korea on 11 June 1871. Fighting hand-to-hand with the enemy, Coleman succeeded in saving the life of Alexander McKenzie.

See also
List of Medal of Honor recipients

References

External links

1847 births
1904 deaths
19th-century Irish people
Irish emigrants to the United States (before 1923)
United States Marine Corps Medal of Honor recipients
United States Marines
People of New York (state) in the American Civil War
People from County Cork
Irish-born Medal of Honor recipients
Korean Expedition (1871) recipients of the Medal of Honor
Burials at Mount Hope Cemetery (San Diego)
Union Army soldiers
Child soldiers in the American Civil War